Marcus Lewis (born February 16, 1992) is an American professional basketball player for Skyliners Frankfurt of the Basketball Bundesliga. He was born in Streamwood, Illinois.

High school career
Lewis played for Streamwood High School, at Streamwood, Illinois.

College career
Lewis played for Parkland College, for South Suburban College and for Eastern Kentucky from 2010 until 2014. During his college career, he was highly regarded as one of the best dunkers in ncaa college basketball.

Professional career
After going undrafted to the 2014 NBA draft, Lewis played five seasons in Canada with Niagara River Lions, St. John's Edge, Moncton Magic and Guelph Nighthawks. After five years in Canada, Lewis signed with Tampereen Pyrintö of the Finnish Korisliiga.

On July 17, 2021, Lewis officially signed with Greek club Lavrio of the Basketball Champions League. In eight games, he averaged 6.6 points and 2.8 rebounds per game.

On November 27, 2021, Lewis signed with Czarni Słupsk of the Polish Basketball League.

On November 20, 2022, he signed with Skyliners Frankfurt of the Basketball Bundesliga.

References

External links
RealGM.com Profile
Eurobasket.com Profile

1992 births
Living people
American men's basketball players
American expatriate basketball people in Canada
American expatriate basketball people in Finland
American expatriate basketball people in Greece
Basketball players from Illinois
Czarni Słupsk players
Eastern Kentucky Colonels men's basketball players
Junior college men's basketball players in the United States
Lavrio B.C. players
Parkland College alumni
People from Streamwood, Illinois
South Suburban College alumni